Rugby-Welfen Braunschweig is a German rugby union team from Braunschweig, Lower Saxony, currently playing in the 2nd Rugby-Bundesliga. The team is part of a larger sports club, TuRa Braunschweig, which apart from rugby also offers other sports like athletics, basketball, gymnastics and pétanque. The team is named after the House of Welf.

History

Post SV Braunschweig

The history of the club's rugby section goes back to 27 January 1954. On that date, the rugby section of Post SV Braunschweig, a large multi-sports club, was founded. The club played mostly in regional lower-tier competitions, but in 1991 won their first (and only) promotion into the Rugby-Bundesliga, but suffered relegation again after just one season at the top-level.

Welfen SC Braunschweig

In the late 1990s, Post SV Braunschweig ran into financial problems, which eventually led to the club's dissolution in 2001. Due to this, the rugby section separated from the parent club and joined Welfen SC Heidberg, another local sports club, in 1999. The club, based in the Heidberg district of Braunschweig and founded in 1973, later changed its name into Welfen SC Braunschweig.

After several seasons in the Rugby-Regionalliga, Welfen SC won promotion back to the 2nd Rugby-Bundesliga in 2011. In the 2014–15 season the club finished second in the north-east Liga-Pokal group and was knocked out by TuS 95 Düsseldorf in the quarter finals of the play-offs.

TuRa Braunschweig

In 2014 the rugby players of Welfen SC decided to leave the club again due to being dissatisfied with the condition of the club's grounds. On 1 January 2015 they joined Turn- und Rasensportverein Braunschweig (short: TuRa Braunschweig), but continue to compete under the name Rugby-Welfen Braunschweig. TuRa Braunschweig had been founded as the city's second gymnastics club (after MTV Braunschweig) in 1865. The club's athletes have also won several German championships in other sports such as acrobatic gymnastics and Steinstossen.

Recent seasons
Recent seasons of the club:

References

External links
  Official website
  Official website of TuRa Braunschweig
  Welfen SC Braunschweig at totalrugby.de

German rugby union clubs
Rugby clubs established in 1954
Welfen
Braunschweig
Organisations based in Braunschweig
1954 establishments in West Germany